Tisová is a municipality and village in Tachov District in the Plzeň Region of the Czech Republic. It has about 500 inhabitants.

Administrative parts
Villages of Hlinné, Jemnice, Kumpolec, Lhotka and Trnová are administrative parts of Tisová.

References

Villages in Tachov District